Slavik Hayrapetyan  (born 16 March 1996) is an Armenian figure skater. A seven-time Armenian national champion, he has won five senior international medals and competed in the final segment at seven ISU Championships, including the 2018 World Championships, four European Championships, and two World Junior Championships.

Personal life 
Slavik Hayrapetyan was born on 16 March 1996 in Yerevan, Armenia. He is the son of Samvel Hayrapetyan, a figure skating coach, and the younger brother of Sarkis Hayrapetyan, a competitive skater.

Career 
Hayrapetyan debuted on the ISU Junior Grand Prix series in 2009. In March 2010, he was sent to The Hague, Netherlands to compete at his first World Junior Championships but was eliminated after placing 34th in the short program. He was also unsuccessful in 2011 and 2012.

Ranked 23rd in the short program, Hayrapetyan advanced to the free skate at the 2013 World Junior Championships in Milan, Italy, and finished 21st overall. He also reached the final segment at the 2015 World Junior Championships in Tallinn, Estonia, where he finished 24th, and at the 2017 European Championships in Ostrava, Czech Republic.

Hayrapetyan qualified to the free skate at the 2018 World Championships in Milan, finishing 23rd overall.

Programs

Competitive highlights 
CS: Challenger Series; JGP: Junior Grand Prix

References

External links 

 
 Slavik Hayrapetyan at Tracings.net

1996 births
Armenian figure skaters
Living people
Sportspeople from Yerevan
Competitors at the 2019 Winter Universiade